The 2007 Bound for Glory was a professional wrestling pay-per-view (PPV) event produced by Total Nonstop Action Wrestling (TNA), which took place on October 14, 2007 at the Arena at Gwinnett Center in the Atlanta suburb of Duluth, Georgia. It was the third event under the Bound for Glory chronology. Nine professional wrestling matches were featured on the event's card.

In October 2017, with the launch of the Global Wrestling Network, the event became available to stream on demand. It would later be available on Impact Plus in May 2019.

Results

Reverse battle royal match
This match was Round One of the 2007 Fight for the Right Tournament. In Part One the first 8 out of 16 wrestlers to enter the ring would automatically be entered into the tournament. Part Two and Three would determine who vs who in the tournament based on place in the over the top rope Battle Royal and then a Singles match. : 1st vs 8th, 2nd vs 7th, 3rd vs 6th and 4th vs 5th.

Part one
This match was a Reverse Battle Royal.

Part two
This part was an over the top rope Battle Royal

Part three
This part was a Singles match.

Two out of three falls tables match

Knockout gauntlet match entrances and eliminations

Hemme was never officially eliminated. She was (kayfabe) unable to continue and was removed from the match by EMTs.

Notes
Adam "Pacman" Jones, who is also from Atlanta and appeared on the show, personally purchased 1,500 tickets with the intention of donating them to the Fulton County School District to be handed out as rewards for scholastic achievement and good conduct.

References

External links
TNAWrestling.com - the official website of Total Nonstop Action Wrestling

Bound for Glory (wrestling pay-per-view)
Professional wrestling in Georgia (U.S. state)
2007 in Georgia (U.S. state)
October 2007 events in the United States
2007 Total Nonstop Action Wrestling pay-per-view events
Events in Duluth, Georgia